Ronnie Singer (June 9, 1928 – September 12, 1953) was an American jazz guitarist from Chicago. Singer was influential on other jazz musicians, and was considered "just as good as Jimmy Raney", according to Jimmy Gourley who played with both guitarists in Chicago. He was heavily addicted to heroin. At the age of 25, he and his wife committed suicide together in a hotel room in New York City.

References

1928 births
1953 suicides
20th-century American guitarists
American jazz guitarists
Bebop guitarists
Guitarists from Chicago
Jazz musicians from Illinois
Jewish American musicians
Jewish jazz musicians
Joint suicides
20th-century American Jews
Suicides in New York City